Everyday of My Life is the second studio album by American recording artist Michael Bolton, and the second recorded under his given name, Michael Bolotin, released on RCA Records in 1976. It features four original songs, plus six covers.

Track listing
"Rocky Mountain Way" (Joe Walsh cover) (Rocke Grace, Kenny Passarelli, Joe Vitale, Joe Walsh) 4:21
"If I Had Your Love" (Michael Bolotin) 3:49
"Everyday of My Life" (Henderson) 3:27
"You Mean More to Me" (Bolotin) 3:35
"Singin' the Blues" (McCreary) 3:41
"Dancing in the Street" (Martha and the Vandellas cover) (Marvin Gaye, Ivy Jo Hunter, William "Mickey" Stevenson) 3:52
"You Make Me Feel Like Lovin' You" (Bolotin) 4:24
"Common Thief" (Bill House cover) (Bill House) 3:22
"These Eyes" (Guess Who cover) (Randy Bachman, Burton Cummings) 3:34
"You've Got the Love that I Need" (Bolotin, Henderson) 3:24

Personnel
Michael Bolton – lead vocals, electric guitar, acoustic guitar
Billy Elworthy – electric guitar, acoustic guitar
Papa John Creach – violin
Patrick Henderson – piano
Jan Mullaney – Hammond organ
Gary Ferraro – bass guitar
Jay Michaels – drums
Colina Phillips – backing vocals
Rhonda Silver – backing vocals
Sharon Williams – backing vocals
Produced by Jack Richardson
Engineered by Brian Christian

References

Michael Bolton albums
1976 albums
Albums produced by Jack Richardson (record producer)
RCA Records albums